Allepipona similis is a species of wasp in the Vespidae family. It was described by Gusenleitner in 2000 and listed in Catalogue of Life: 2011 Annual Checklist.

References

Potter wasps
Insects described in 2000